Synapse is a free and open-source application launcher for Linux originally created by Michal Hruby and Alberto Aldegheri.

See also
 Comparison of applications launchers

References

External links

 

Application launchers
Free software programmed in Vala
2010 software
Linux software